The National Anthem or Guoge (Chinese: 国歌) is a 1999 Chinese historical drama centered on the composition of "The March of the Volunteers", the theme song to the 1935 drama Children of Troubled Times which was later adopted as the national anthem of the People's Republic of China. The lyrics were composed by poet and playwright Tian Han (played by He Zhengjun) and set to music by the composer Nie Er (played by Chen Kun in his first role). The film is noteworthy for being told from the point of view of Tian, who fell from favor during the Cultural Revolution before being posthumously rehabilitated in the late 1970s. The movie was released to coïncide with the 50th anniversary of the PRC's founding.

The timing and subject matter mirror the 1959 Nie Er, a highly fictionalized version of the same events which did not even include Tian.

It was a flop, estimated to have lost  at the box office; the movie still managed to turn a profit for the Xiaoxiang Film Studio, however, owing to its  in subsidies and a million- excellence-in-filmmaking prize at the Huabiao Awards. It also won a special prize from the Golden Rooster Awards and best picture at the Hundred Flowers Awards.

See also
 List of Chinese movies of 1999
 Nie Er, the 1959 film retelling the same story from Nie Er's point of view

References

External links
  at Hudong Baike 
 

1990s historical films
1990s Mandarin-language films
Chinese historical films